Maghan III, also known as Mahmud I, was mansa of the Mali Empire from 1390 to about 1400.  He assumed the throne following the usurper Sandaki, who ruled for only two years.

See also
Mali Empire
Keita Dynasty

1400 deaths
Mansas of Mali
People of the Mali Empire
14th-century monarchs in Africa
Year of birth unknown
Keita family